is a Japanese professional footballer who plays as a centre back for Sanfrecce Hiroshima and the Japan national team.

Honours

Club
Sanfrecce Hiroshima
 J.League Cup: 2022

References

External links

Hayato Araki at Soccerway

1996 births
Living people
Japanese footballers
Association football defenders
Sanfrecce Hiroshima players
J1 League players